The Reproductive Freedom Alliance is an interstate gubernatorial agreement announced in 2023 to defend the right to abortion and reproductive freedoms.  Major funding for the Alliance is provided by the California Wellness Foundation with additional support from the Rosenberg Foundation.

Signatories 

 California Governor Gavin Newsom
 Colorado Governor Jared Polis
 Connecticut Governor Ned Lamont
 Delaware Governor John Carney
 Hawai’i Governor Josh Green
 Illinois Governor JB Pritzker
 Maine Governor Janet Mills
 Maryland Governor Wes Moore
 Massachusetts Governor Maura Healey
 Michigan Governor Gretchen Whitmer
 Minnesota Governor Tim Walz
 New Jersey Governor Phil Murphy, 
 New Mexico Governor Michelle Lujan Grisham, 
 New York Governor Kathy Hochul
 North Carolina Governor Roy Cooper, 
 Oregon Governor Tina Kotek
 Pennsylvania Governor Josh Shapiro
 Rhode Island Governor Daniel McKee
 Washington Governor Jay Inslee
 Wisconsin Governor Tony Evers

References 

United States interstate compacts
Abortion in the United States
Gavin Newsom